Louis of Clermont or Louis de Clermont may refer to:

Louis I, Count of Blois, also count of Clermont-en-Beauvaisis (1191–1205)
Louis I, Duke of Bourbon, also count of Clermont-en-Beauvaisis (1317–1327, 1331–1342)
Louis II, Duke of Bourbon, also count of Clermont-en-Beauvaisis (1356–1410)
, bishop of Clermont (1650–1664)
, bishop of Clermont (1716–1717)
Louis, Count of Clermont, being Clermont-en-Argonne (1709–1771)
Lewis de Claremont, pseudonym, American occultist  author (fl. 1930s)